Saya is a rural locality (a selo) in Beryozovsky District, Perm Krai, Russia. The population was 275 as of 2010. There are 5 streets.

Geography 
Saya is located 30 km northeast of  Beryozovka (the district's administrative centre) by road. Berezovaya Gora is the nearest rural locality.

References 

Rural localities in Beryozovsky District, Perm Krai